Gorenje Gradišče may refer to the following places in Slovenia:

Gorenje Gradišče, Dolenjske Toplice, a village in the Municipality of Dolenjske Toplice
Gorenje Gradišče pri Šentjerneju, a village in the Municipality of Šentjernej

See also
Gorenje (disambiguation)
Gradišče (disambiguation)
Dolenje Gradišče (disambiguation)